Juan Antonio González may refer to:

 Juan Antonio González Iglesias (born 1964), Spanish poet
 Juan Antonio González Ureña (born 1967), Spanish  footballer
 Juan Antonio González Crespo (born 1972), Uruguayan  footballer
 Juan Antonio Gonzalez Fernandez, also known as Juanan (born 1987), Spanish footballer
 Juan Antonio Simarro González (born 1973), Spanish composer, interpreter and producer

See also 
 Gonzalez (disambiguation)